Giuseppe Scarlatti (1718 or 18 June 1723, Naples – 17 August 1777, Vienna) was a composer of opere serie and opere buffe. He worked in Rome from 1739 to 1741, and from 1752 to 1754 in Florence, Pisa, Lucca and Turin. From 1752 to 1754, and again from 1756 to 1759, he worked in Venice and for short periods in Milan and Barcelona. In 1760 he moved to Vienna, where he enjoyed the friendship of Christoph Willibald Gluck. "The third most important musician of his clan", it is still uncertain whether he was born on 18 June 1723 as the nephew of Alessandro or in 1718 as nephew of Domenico. Giuseppe Scarlatti was married to the Viennese singer Barbara Stabili who died about 1753. By 1767 he had married Antonia Lefebvre, who that year bore him a son; she died three years later. Scarlatti died intestate in 1777 in Vienna.

Works

Operas

Dubious attributions 
La madamigella (libretto by Antonio Palomba, 1755, Naples)
Il mercato di Malmantide (dramma giocoso per musica, libretto by Carlo Goldoni, 1758, Venice)

Other works 
La Santissima Vergine annunziata (oratorio, 1739, Rome)
Componimento per musica (serenata, 1739, Rome)
L'amor della patria (serenata, libretto by Carlo Goldoni, 1752, Venice)
Les aventures de Serail (ballet, 1762, Vienna)
Imeneo, sognando talora (cantata for tenor and basso continuo)
I lamenti d'Orfeo (cantata for 2 voices and orchestra)
Amor prigioniero (cantata for 2 sopranos and instruments)
Various arias
Sonata for clavicembalo

References

External links
 

Italian classical composers
Italian male classical composers
Italian opera composers
Male opera composers
1777 deaths
Year of birth uncertain
Musicians from Naples